Shiruya al-Uswari (in Middle Persian: Shērōē) was an Iranian nobleman, who was part of the Sasanian asbaran unit, but later defected together with a faction of the unit to the Rashidun Caliphate, where the unit became known as the Asawira. He settled in Basra, and married a Sasanian princess called Marjana (or Manjana), whom he built a palace for on a canal in Basra

Sources 
 

7th-century Iranian people
People of the Muslim conquest of Persia
Year of birth unknown
7th-century deaths